Poong, the Joseon Psychiatrist is a South Korean television series starring Kim Min-jae in the title role, along with Kim Hyang-gi and Kim Sang-kyung. Based on the novel of the same name that won the Excellence Award in the 2016 Korea Story Contest, it depicts the stories of psychiatrists in Joseon. 

It premiered on tvN on August 1, 2022, and aired every Monday and Tuesday at 22:30 (KST) for 12 episodes in the first season. The second season premiered on January 11, 2023 and aired every Wednesday and Thursday at 22:30 (KST). It is also available for streaming on Viu in selected regions.

Series overview

Synopsis
Yoo Se-yeop (Kim Min-jae) is a genius physician for the royal family, but is expelled from the capital after falling victim to a conspiracy. He later meets an eccentric teacher, Gye Ji-han (Kim Sang-kyung) and a widow, Seo Eun-woo (Kim Hyang-gi) in the mysterious and beautiful Gyesu Village. He is reborn as a true doctor who aims to heal people's hearts, writing the prescription of happiness.

Cast

Main
 Kim Min-jae as Yoo Se-yeop / Yoo Se-poong
 Born to a noble family, he becomes the head acupuncturist of the palace. When the King dies after he performs acupuncture on him, he is expelled from the palace and his own father is murdered. Traumatised by these events, he can no longer practice acupuncture and cannot sleep because of nightmares. After wandering around for a year, he arrives at Gyesu Village, where he gains the nickname 'Poong'.
 Kim Hyang-gi as Seo Eun-woo
 A young widow who listens to the stories of those who are sick. She is the daughter of the magistrate of Sorak. Following her husband's death on her wedding day, she was constantly bullied by her in-laws, which led her to attempt suicide multiple times. After being freed from her in-laws, she starts learning medicine at Gyesu Clinic in order to become a female physician.
 Kim Sang-kyung as Gye Ji-han
 The head of Gyesu Clinic. A geeky doctor and Yoo Se-poong's 'outside-of-the-box' teacher. Though he appears to be greedy for money, he is a warm-hearted person who helps those in need.

Supporting

Gyesu Village
 Ahn Chang-hwan as Man-bok
 Yoo Se-poong's loyal servant who stays with him after his expulsion from the capital. Together they relocate to Gyesu Village after wandering around the countryside for a year.
 Jeon Guk-hyang as 'Grandmother'
 An old woman with dementia who mistakes Yoo Se-yeop for her son, Poong.
 Yeon-Bora as Nam-hae
 The housekeeper and cook of Gyesu Clinic.
 Kim Su-an as Ip-bun 
 Gye Ji-han's daughter.
 Han Chang-min as Jang-goon
 An autistic boy in charge of the medicine warehouse of Gyesu Clinic.

Royal Court
 Yoo Sung-joo as Cho Tae-hak
 The Left State Councillor. He controls the court and moves Joseon behind the king.
 Lee Seo-hwan as Shin Gwi-soo
 An ambitious physician in the royal court.
 Oh Kyung-joo as the Crown Prince
 The Crown Prince, who becomes the King following his father's death. He has a close relationship with Yoo Se-poong.
 Kang Young-seok as Jeon Kang-il  
 An inspector who comes to inspect the county council.
 Woo Da-bi as Lee Seo-yi
 A royal princess and King's half-sister.
 Jang Sun as Court Lady Jung
 A court lady who serves princess Lee Seo-yi.

Sorak County
 Jung Won-chang as Cho Shin-woo
 A Royal Inspector who grew up in Sorak, and the adopted son of Cho Tae-hak.
 Kim Hak-sun as Seo Hyun-ryeong
 The magistrate of Sorak, and Seo Eun-woo's father.
 Kim Hyung-Mook as Im Soon-man
 A greedy nobleman in Sorak.

Other
 Jung Min-ah as Queen
 Baek Sung-cheol as Ahn Hak-soo  
 Sorak's new governor

Special appearances

 Ahn Nae-sang as the King (Ep. 1)
 Jang Hyun-sung as Minister Yoo Hoo-myung, Yoo Se-poong's father (Ep. 1)
 Oh Dae-hwan as a palace physician (Ep. 1)
 Yoon Byung-hee as a tightrope-walker (Ep. 1)
 Kim Joo-ryoung as Seo Eun-woo's mother-in-law (Ep. 1–3)
 Go Geon-han as Lee Ho-jun, Seo Eun-woo's brother-in-law (Ep. 2–3)
 Lee Sang-yi as Kim Yun-gyeom, son of 'Grandmother' (Ep. 2)
 Jang Hee-ryung as Hyo-yeon, a noble lady (Ep. 4–5)
 Baek Seok-kwang as Gil-su, Hyo-yeon's fiancé (Ep. 4–5)
 Moon Yong-il as Gaeban, Hyo-yeon's servant (Ep. 4–5)
 Lee Ji-ha as Lord Jo's wife (Ep.5–6)

 Oh Han-gyeol as Seok-cheol, the illegitimate son of Lord Jo (Ep.5–6)
 Son Jong-hak as Lord Jo, Seok-cheol's father (Ep.5–6)
 Jung Ye-bin as Seok-cheol's mother, and Lord Jo's concubine (Ep.5–6)
 Kim Han-na as Jang Yoo-jeong, a bookstore owner's daughter who married a poor nobleman (Ep.7)
 Ahn Sang-woo as Jang Yoo-jeong's husband (Ep.7) 
 Ji-eun as Heo, a woman involved with Jang Yoo-jeong's husband (Ep.7)
 Park Jae-wan as Jeon Kyu-hyung, a teacher who was killed in the past (Ep.8)
 Lee Kyu-hyun as Moo-yeong, an herbalist and Yeon-hwa's lover (Ep.9)
 Jeon Hye-yeon as Yeon-hwa, a noble lady and Moo-yeong's lover (Ep.9) 
 Park Si-hyun as Heo, the wife of nobleman Choi Jam-pan (Ep.9)
 Park Se-hyun as Wol, a court lady from the Royal Kitchen (Ep.10–12)

 Lee Min-ji as Deok-hee, a court lady (Ep.1–2)
 Choi Jae-seop as Eunuch Yun, the king's aide (Ep.1–2)  
 Choi Ji-soo as Jeong-soon, An officer who works at a paper mill and a bully in So-cheon (Ep.3–4)  
 Lee Ga-eun as So-cheon, An officer who works on a paper (Ep.3–4) 
 Jo Soo-ha as Chun-wol, the courtesan of Mohwagak. (Ep.7–8)

Production
On March 31, 2022, a bus carrying the production staff of Poong, the Joseon Psychiatrist was involved in a collision. A PD from the directing department was killed and ten others were injured in the accident. Filming of the drama was halted. On May 11, 2022, the production company announced that the drama had resumed filming the previous week. 

The series is planned to span multiple seasons, with the first season consisting of 12 episodes.

Original soundtrack

Part 1

Part 2

Viewership

Season 1

Season 2

References

External links
  
 
 
 
 
 Poong, the Joseon Psychiatrist at Daum 
 Poong, the Joseon Psychiatrist at Naver 

TVN (South Korean TV channel) television dramas
2022 South Korean television series debuts
2023 South Korean television series endings
Korean-language television shows
South Korean historical television series
South Korean medical television series
South Korean comedy television series
Television series set in the Joseon dynasty
Works about psychiatry
Television shows based on South Korean novels
Television series by Studio Dragon